Call of Duty: Black Ops III is a 2015 first-person shooter game developed by Treyarch and published by Activision. It is the twelfth entry in the Call of Duty series and the sequel to the 2012 video game Call of Duty: Black Ops II. It was released on PlayStation 4, Windows, and Xbox One on November 6, 2015. A feature-limited version developed by Beenox and Mercenary Technology that only supports multiplayer modes was released on PlayStation 3 and Xbox 360 and was also the final Call of Duty title released on those platforms.

Black Ops III takes place in 2065, 40 years after the events of Black Ops II, in a world facing upheaval from climate change and new technologies. Similar to its predecessors, the story follows a group of black ops soldiers. The game's campaign is designed to support 4-player cooperative gameplay, allowing for bigger, more open level design and less corridor shooting. As the player character is cybernetically enhanced, players have access to various special activities. The game also features a standalone Zombies campaign mode, and a "Nightmares" mode which replaces all enemies as zombies.

Announced in April 2015, the game is the first Call of Duty video game released after Activision ended its partnership with Microsoft Studios and instead partnered with Sony Computer Entertainment, which secured the timed exclusivity of the game's downloadable content. Upon release, the game received generally positive reviews from critics, praising the gameplay, Zombies mode, and amount of content. However, it was also criticized for its story and lack of innovation. The seventh-generation console versions in particular were singled-out for their lack of a campaign and numerous features, as well as them being online-only. It was a commercial success, with it becoming the top-selling retail game in the US in 2015, and one of the most successful titles released for the eighth generation of video game consoles.

A sequel, Call of Duty: Black Ops 4, was released on October 12, 2018.

Gameplay

Campaign 
The campaign in Black Ops III is designed to support 4-player cooperative gameplay, allowing for bigger, more open level design and less corridor shooting. In addition, the player can customize their character's appearance and clothing. The campaign features its own progression system, featuring unlock tokens which must be used to acquire different weapons and gears as they progress through the campaign. The game features a "realistic" difficulty mode, in which players will get defeated if they are hit by one bullet. Finishing all campaign missions will also unlock "Nightmares" mode, where players can replay the entire campaign with a new narrative, as well as zombies replacing most of the normal enemies.

Multiplayer
The multiplayer introduces a new momentum based movement system, which utilizes thruster packs to allow players to perform slow boosts into the air, as well as perform wall running and sliding, all the while giving players complete gun control. In addition to the Pick 10 class system from Black Ops II, Treyarch implemented a character system called "Specialists", where players can pick from 9 different soldiers, each with either a special weapon or ability unique to them. In a later update, a tenth specialist named Blackjack was added to the game. Blackjack is able to mimic the abilities of other specialists, and is only playable for a short amount of time upon completing a set of challenges. A new "Gunsmith" feature offers aesthetic variations in weapon attachments, allowing various weapon customization combinations. The Paintshop feature allows players to create their own custom prints onto specific portions of a gun, further emphasizing the depth of customization in the game.

Zombies
Call of Duty: Black Ops 3 Zombies takes place over a variety of different locations as well as different points in time. Zombies features a new XP progression system, which allows players to unlock items in a similar fashion to multiplayer and campaign. Unlockable items include "Gobblegums", which grant players with temporary bonuses, and weapon kits that allow players to modify the appearance and attributes of the guns with various camos and attachments. Shadows of Evil was revealed as a new map for the Zombies mode on July 9, 2015, at San Diego Comic-Con International 2015. The map features four brand new characters: Nero the Magician, Jessica the Femme Fatale, Vincent the Cop and Campbell the Boxer as the main cast, and takes place in a new setting called Morg City. "The Giant" includes the original characters, Tank Dempsey, Edward Richtofen, Nikolai Belinski and Takeo Masaki. These characters return from the Black Ops II map "Origins", in their alternate timeline versions. They reappear in the DLC maps "The Giant", "Der Eisendrache", "Zetsubou no Shima", "Gorod Krovi" and "Revelations". The zombies gamemode involves a story, which links with every DLC. On May 16, 2017, Treyarch released a fifth DLC including the remastered versions of Zombies maps from their previous Call of Duty games, called "Zombies Chronicles". These maps are "Nacht der Untoten", "Verrückt", "Shi No Numa", "Kino der Toten", "Ascension", "Shangri La", "Moon" and "Origins". These maps retain most of the original aesthetics updated with Black Ops III's graphics engine, while also adding to the gameplay elements of Black Ops III, with the introduction of new Gobblegums, Weapons and Sound Design.

Plot

Single-player campaign

Setting and characters
Call of Duty: Black Ops III takes place in 2065, 40 years after the events of Black Ops II, in a world facing upheaval from conflicts, climate change and new technologies. A Third Cold War is ongoing between two global alliances, known as the Winslow Accord and the Common Defense Pact. In response to the drone assaults caused by the Nicaraguan narco-terrorist Raul Menendez on June 19, 2025, several countries around the world have developed Directed Energy Air Defense systems that render conventional air forces virtually useless. As such, most of the warfare between countries is done by covert operatives fighting behind enemy lines. Military technology has progressed to the point where robotics play a major role in combat, and both fully robotic humanoid drones and cyborg supersoldiers have been developed to fight in the battlefield. There is speculation and fear about an eventual robotic takeover.

Like previous installments in the Black Ops series, the campaign follows a team of black ops soldiers, who work for Winslow Accord. The player character (voiced by Ben Browder if male and Abby Brammell if female) and Jacob Hendricks (Sean Douglas) are members of the faction's wetwork team, while Commander John Taylor (Christopher Meloni) and his team Sebastian Diaz (Reynaldo Gallegos), Sarah Hall (Katee Sackhoff), and Peter Maretti (Ary Katz), compose the faction's cybernetics division. Rachel Kimsey voices CIA agent Rachel Kane, Robert Picardo voices the Coalescence Corporation CEO Sebastian Krueger, Tony Amendola voices the therapist Dr. Yousef Salim, and Lynn Chen voices the 54 Immortals criminal organization leader, Goh Xiulan. NFL running back Marshawn Lynch makes a cameo appearance in the game as a 54 Immortals mercenary.

Included in the game is the "Nightmares" campaign mode, which is a retelling of the main campaign with the plot changed to incorporate zombies and other supernatural beings. In this campaign, the lethal Virus 61-15 is released in various cities around the world, turning whoever it infects into zombies. In response, the governments of the world seal off the worst infected areas into Quarantine Zones and form the Deadkillers, cybernetic soldiers trained to exterminate zombies.

Story
On October 27, 2065, the Winslow Accord black ops initiate a successful mission in Ethiopia to rescue hostages from the tyrannical Nile River Coalition. However, the Player is critically wounded by a combat robot. Rescued by Taylor, the Player undergoes cybernetic surgery to save their life, being installed with a direct neural interface (DNI) and receiving virtual training from Taylor and his team during surgery. Hendricks also undergoes surgery.

After five years of wetwork, the Player and Hendricks are put under the command of Rachel Kane and tasked with investigating a CIA black site in Singapore that has gone quiet. They find the area attacked by the paramilitary crime syndicate 54 Immortals and the site's data stolen. Kane concludes that Taylor and his team defected and murdered the staff. The Player and Hendricks then disguise themselves as arms dealers and meet with the 54 Immortals. The mission goes awry when their cover is blown, causing the death of one of the 54i's leaders, Goh Min. They manage to recover data regarding Taylor's last known location, a facility of the Coalescence Corporation in Singapore (destroyed ten years prior in a mysterious explosion that killed 300,000 people and turned most of the island's east inhospitable).

The Player and Hendricks travel to the facility and discover a hidden CIA research laboratory. The pair find Diaz leaking CIA information and are forced to kill him. Interfacing with Diaz's DNI, Hendricks discovers Taylor is trying to find the survivors of the explosion: Sebastian Krueger and Dr. Yousef Salim. The leaked information allows the Immortals to capture Kane. The Player disobeys Kane's orders to leave and rescues her by killing the Immortals' other leader, Goh Min's sister Xiulan. The trio then heads to Egypt and finds Salim, who reveals that he performed secret DNI experiments involving comforting humans via a calming exercise involving imagining a frozen forest.

Salim is then interrogated and executed by Taylor. The Player, Hendricks, and Kane pursue Taylor with assistance from the Egyptian Army. After killing Hall, the Player connects to her DNI and encounters Corvus, a gestalt intelligence created during the experiments to monitor thoughts of DNI users, which malfunctioned, causing the explosion. Infecting Taylor and his team, Corvus made them obsessed with finding the forest, with the Player and Hendricks also becoming infected after interfacing with Hall and Diaz.

After killing Maretti, the pair track down Taylor in Cairo. After wounding the Player, Taylor manages to resist Corvus and tear his DNI out, sparing the Player. However, Hendricks succumbs to Corvus and kills Taylor before abandoning the Player, leaving for Zürich to find Krueger. The Player races to Zürich with Kane to stop him. Reaching Zürich's Coalescence Corporation, the pair discover Corvus caused the explosion in Singapore with the Nova 6 gas. Kane attempts to contain it, but Corvus locks her in the compound room, leaking the gas to kill her in front of a helpless Player.

Continuing on, the Player finds Hendricks holding Krueger hostage. After Hendricks kills Krueger, the Player kills him in turn. The Player then tries to kill themselves to end Corvus' infection, but ends up in a simulated frozen forest created by Corvus to retain the consciousness of dead DNI users. Still alive after becoming a glitch in the forest, Taylor reunites with the Player, stating that they must purge their DNI to end Corvus. With Taylor's help, the Player resists Corvus' last-ditch manipulation and purges their DNI, erasing the virus. Stumbling out of the Zurich headquarters, the Player identifies themselves to Zürich Security Forces as "Taylor."

Reality

Taylor's mission reports reveal that the Player actually died during their cybernetics surgery during the mission New World, due to complications. The resulting events until Taylor's death occur in a simulation deviating from Taylor's and Hendricks's experience of hunting down Dylan Stone and his team (Javier Ramirez, Alice Conrad, and Joseph Fierro), their teammates who defected after finding the CIA black site. The Player's consciousness is shown living in Taylor's mind throughout the simulation, indicating that the Player manages to take over Taylor's body after his simulated death until the DNI purge sees Corvus and the Player erased as Taylor regains control.

Nightmares
The Player wakes up only to be told by Dr. Salim that they are dead, and that the Player must recount their memories. The Player tells Dr. Salim that they are a Deadkiller who was sent to investigate the disappearance of Taylor's Deadkiller team. However, upon investigating, the Player and Hendricks discover that Taylor's team has used their DNI connections to disable the Quarantine Zone defenses all over the world. Teaming up with Rachel Kane, the Player and Hendricks chase Taylor's team all from Singapore to Egypt, eventually being forced to kill the entire team. However, Hendricks is infected by the same virus that turned Taylor and his team mad, and heads for Zurich. The Player discovers that Dr. Salim is in fact Deimos, the demigod responsible for unleashing the undead plague on humanity. Deimos had entered the Player's mind when they interfaced with Hall, and attempts to manipulate them into opening a portal to his home dimension, Malus. The Player is then contacted by another demigod, Dolos, who is sympathetic to humanity and seeks to kill Deimos, her brother. Dolos transports both the Player and Deimos to Malus, where Deimos is vulnerable. Under Dolos' guidance, the Player kills Deimos, ending the undead plague on Earth, but trapping the Player in Malus. Dolos then explains to the Player that her true plans are to kill every other demigod and supernatural being that can challenge her, and the Player agrees to help her.

Multiplayer
The Multiplayer mode of Black Ops III features a shared narrative setting with the campaign, in which players battle in virtual simulations across a variety of battlefields, while wielding the avatars of nine elite soldiers, referred to collectively as "Specialists": infantry grunt Donnie "Ruin" Walsh; scoutswoman Alessandra "Outrider" Castillo; engineer David "Prophet" Wilkes; demolitions expert Erin "Battery" Baker; 54 Immortals enforcer He "Seraph" Zhen-Zhen; survivalist Tavo "Nomad" Rojas; specialized combat robot "Reaper"; assassin "Spectre"; and arsonist Krystof "Firebreak" Hejek.

Through progression of each Specialist, players can unlock audio logs that provide backstories of each of the soldiers. Full progression of all Specialists unlocks a final audio log, in which an unknown informant reports to their superior about keeping tabs on "eight other soldiers", implying that one of the Specialists is not a simulated avatar, but the real person injecting themselves into the simulation to monitor the others.

Zombies

Characters and setting
Like in previous games, the Zombies storyline in Call of Duty: Black Ops III is told in an episodic format, with one map, "Shadows of Evil", available at launch, and the rest to follow in the downloadable content season. "Shadows of Evil" focuses on a new group of characters: Nero Blackstone (Jeff Goldblum), Jessica Rose (Heather Graham), Jack Vincent (Neal McDonough) and Floyd Campbell (Ron Perlman), who reside in the fictional Morg City. Treyarch describes the new characters as "troubled individuals" with "a long and sordid history of past misdeeds". The four characters are thrown into a twisted version of the city, overrun by zombies, and are guided by a mysterious, unreliable figure called the Shadowman (Robert Picardo).

"Shadows of Evil" acts as a prologue that leads into the core storyline, focusing on the Dimension 63 version of the original characters: "Tank" Dempsey (Steven Blum), Nikolai Belinski (Fred Tatasciore), Takeo Masaki (Tom Kane) and Edward Richtofen (Nolan North), who were introduced in the Black Ops II map "Origins", referred to collectively as Primis. Their story continues from where "Origins" left off, as they attempt to prevent the events of the original timeline from ever occurring across the multiverse. Other characters include the leader of Group 935, Doctor Ludvig Maxis (also voiced by Tatasciore), and his daughter Samantha. The downloadable content maps feature the original versions of Primis, referred to as Ultimis, and reintroduce various minor characters mentioned/featured in previous games, including Group 935 scientist Doctor Groph (also voiced by Blum), the OSS spy Peter McCain, Dr. Maxis' assistant Sophia (Christa Lewis), the Ascension Group scientist Gersh, as well as introduces the mysterious omnipotent being Doctor Monty (Malcolm McDowell). Robert Picardo also briefly reprises his role from Call of Duty: Black Ops as United States Secretary of Defense Robert McNamara.

Storyline
Following the undead outbreak in 1918, Northern France of Dimension 63, Doctor Ludvig Maxis, whose brain resided in a mechanical drone at the time, arrives at Agartha and is given a new body by Doctor Monty, a self-proclaimed omnipotent being and member of the Order of the Keepers. After helping to cleanse the soul of his daughter Samantha from the original timeline, Monty instructs Maxis to retrieve an artifact called the Summoning Key, a powerful artifact that can fix their world back to its original state. To do so, Maxis instructs his friend Doctor Edward Richtofen to retrieve the Kronorium, an ancient book detailing the events of every universe and dimension, which contains the location of the Key.

After learning of the Key's location, Richtofen travels to Dimension 63 and arrives in Morg City in 1944, where the Apothicons, former Keepers who were corrupted and mutated by the dark energy of the Aether, manipulated four individuals: Jessica Rose, a burlesque dancer; Jack Vincent, a corrupt cop; Floyd Campbell, an up-and-coming boxer; and Nero Blackstone, a washed-up magician. Misled into doing the bidding of the head Apothicon named the Shadowman, the four opened a rift beneath the city using the Summoning Key, thereby freeing an ancient Apothicon beast. With the Keepers' aid, the four manage to trap the Shadowman inside the Key, and banish the beast from their dimension. Before they could retrieve the Summoning Key from the Keepers, however, Richtofen snags the Key from them, thanks them for their effort and exits through a portal, leaving the four and the rest of Dimension 63 to be doomed by the Apothicons.

The Dimension 63 versions of "Tank" Dempsey, Nikolai Belinski, and Takeo Masaki pursue Richtofen in his interdimensional journey, and arrive in the Der Riese facility in the original timeline, only moments after Maxis and Samantha were teleported away by the original Richtofen. The three attempt to convince him to awaken their original selves, but are interrupted by the Dimension 63 Richtofen, who appears out of the teleporter and kills his counterpart, triggering various timeline fractures. The four then band together to fend off the zombie horde once more; eventually, they activate a beacon within the facility, allowing Maxis to locate them from Agartha.

In pursuit of the original Dempsey, the four then travel to Der Eisendrache, Group 935's fortress in Austria. Despite Group 935 member Doctor Groph's attempt at preventing the group from retrieving the test subject, he ultimately fails and perishes when Richtofen overrides the castle's defense system and sends a barrage of missiles to destroy the moon and Group 935's base on it. As the four retrieve the original Dempsey, Richtofen reveals his plan to prevent their original incarnations from wreaking havoc upon the universe. Dimension 63 Dempsey then volunteers to kill his own counterpart before allowing Richtofen to absorb his soul with the Key.

Afterwards, the group attempts to teleport to a new fractured timeline to locate the original Takeo, who is held prisoner at a Pacific island by the Japanese research group Division 9. They discover that Division 9 had been experimenting with plant life mutation using Element 115, with the original Takeo also a victim of the experimentation. After they manage to release him from the mutation, Dimension 63 Takeo is shocked to learn that the Empire of Japan betrayed his original self and sent him to this island out of petty jealousy. The original Takeo proceeds to commit seppuku, with his Dimension 63 self decapitating him. After absorbing the original Takeo's soul with the Key, Richtofen takes the crew to Alcatraz in Dimension 63, where they retrieve several blood vials, the purpose of which he refuses to explain at the time.

The crew then teleports to another fractured timeline and lands in a war-torn Stalingrad in 1945, where the Soviet Union has stolen Group 935's technology to create their own giant robots and mechanical soldiers, while Nazi Germany is aided by ancient dragons resurrected and bred by Division 9. As the crew traverses across the city, they are forced to help Sophia, Maxis' former assistant who has been transformed into a machine, to initiate the Ascension Protocol, allowing her to gain knowledge of interdimensional travel. Monty also introduces himself to the crew, as he informs them of the state of the multiverse. Amidst the chaos, the original Nikolai, who has taken control of a modified drone unit, teams up with the group to destroy the alpha dragon. However, upon the dragon's death, Nikolai refuses to surrender, forcing the four to take out his drone. The original Nikolai is angered by his Dimension 63 self as he mentions their deceased wife, and attempts to shoot him, only to be killed in retaliation. With all souls collected, Richtofen calls out to Maxis to summon a portal, and release the souls into it.

The group returns to Agartha and arrives in "The House", a place built by Monty to prevent all forces of evil from infecting it, ensuring the safety of the children (Samantha and cleansed versions of the original souls in child form). After sealing off the House from the rest of the multiverse, Maxis is manipulated by the voice of the Shadowman into releasing him upon contact with the Summoning Key. The Shadowman then uses his power to merge various other dimensions, including the Dark Aether, allowing the Apothicons to enter and wreak havoc. Richtofen and the crew manage to help Sophia enter the dimension, and with her assistance, retrieve the Summoning Key and the Kronorium. They then confront the Shadowman together, and defeat him once and for all using the combined power of the two artifacts. Maxis, who still resides within the Key, then absorbs the souls of the children into the Key, and joins Sophia as they fly toward the Apothicon sun, banishing all Apothicon presences from Agartha. Richtofen and the crew are able to remain in the dimension without fading from existence, thanks to the blood vials they retrieved earlier. Monty, worried about the four becoming a paradox in his perfect world, contemplates between erasing their existence and sending them to a distant corner of the universe. In a moment, the four begin to fade away, then reappear in ancient medieval times, where they would be remembered as "Primis", heroes who aided the Keepers in sealing away the Apothicons in the Great War, effectively "completing the cycle" of the universe.

Development
Call of Duty: Black Ops III is the twelfth game in the Call of Duty franchise, and the fourth entry in the Black Ops series. The game was the second to benefit under publisher Activision's three-year development cycle, the first being Call of Duty: Advanced Warfare. The cycle allows each of the development teams of the Call of Duty series (Infinity Ward, Treyarch, and Sledgehammer Games) to develop games in a three-year timespan, as opposed to the two allowed previously. Black Ops III uses a heavily modified version of the IW engine used previously in Black Ops II.

On June 9, 2015, versions for the PlayStation 3 and Xbox 360 were confirmed to be under development by Beenox and Mercenary Technology. These versions lack some features available on other platforms, such as the game's campaign mode and the remaining DLC contents. On June 15, 2015, it was announced that as part of a new exclusivity deal with Sony Computer Entertainment, all downloadable content for future Call of Duty games, beginning with Black Ops III, would be released first on PlayStation platforms as timed exclusives. This ends a similar exclusivity deal with Microsoft dating back to Call of Duty 4: Modern Warfare.

According to gaming journalist Jason Schreier, Call of Duty: Black Ops III was initially intended to include an open-world campaign, but was scrapped during development, resulting in a period of crunch for employees.

A multiplayer beta was released for the PlayStation 4 on August 18, 2015, and was released for Windows and the Xbox One on August 26, 2015. All versions of the multiplayer beta ran for six days.

Music
Jack Wall, who previously composed the score for Call of Duty: Black Ops II, returned along with Treyarch's Audio Director Brian Tuey to compose the score for the game. The game also featured an instrumental score entitled "Jade Helm", provided by Avenged Sevenfold, for use in the multiplayer mode. Additionally, both Wall, Tuey and Treyarch's Sound Designer Kevin Sherwood contributed to the composition of the Zombies mode's soundtrack, including several new songs performed by Elena Siegman and Malukah for each of the maps.

To promote, the DJ and producer Afrojack did a song for the game, called "Unstoppable".

Marketing

Reveal
Teasers were released beginning with Snapchat links appearing in the gameplay of Black Ops II as well as a teaser video released by Treyarch. On April 26, 2015, the first reveal trailer for the game was released and revealed the return of the Zombies mode and beta access for people that pre-order the game for the PC, PS4, and Xbox One. The full game was released on November 6, 2015.

Controversy
On September 29, 2015, the official Twitter account of Call of Duty was temporarily renamed to "Current Events Aggregate". It then began tweeting messages about real-life fashion, movies and a terrorist attack that takes place in Singapore. Activision later revealed that these tweets are fake, and served to promote the game's story campaign. This marketing campaign was strongly criticized for faking news, and publisher Activision was blamed for being "irresponsible". The game's director Jason Blundell said that the team was "shocked" by the negative reaction of the marketing campaign, and offered an apology.

Seize Glory
Seize Glory is an official live action trailer for Call of Duty: Black Ops 3 that was directed by Wayne McClammy and starring Michael B. Jordan, Cara Delevingne and Marshawn Lynch. The trailer features Michael B. Jordan following a man named Kevin as he runs through warfare while destroying zombies and robots. The trailer first aired during November 2015.

The trailer begins with “Paint It Black” by The Rolling Stones as the background music. The setting is a war zone of explosions, soldiers, and a demolished city. Michael B. Jordan standing on a tower, watching over the battle, looks at the camera and says, “What? Y’all don't know about Kevin?” Kevin, a younger man, explodes onto the battle field with a large assault rifle. Kevin runs through the chaotic city enjoying himself as he shoots at everything and Michael B. Jordan builds up Kevin's character. Kevin performs exciting moves like sliding down stairs and running on walls. Kevin even eats a sandwich while setting off explosives on enemies. Then, Marshawn Lynch, a star running back in the National Football League, fully geared with weapons and armor slides in, ready to take out a whole room of zombies. Kevin flies in and steals Marshawn's glory. Kevin makes the classic cool guy move by setting of explosives behind him without looking while he walks away. Suddenly, a girl that Michael B. Jordan introduces as Cara, jumps down from the sky and sends Kevin off the screen. Cara, a young woman, takes Kevin's spotlight and starts wreaking havoc on the battle field. Cara, smiling, throws her handguns to the side while walking away from explosions in the background. In the middle of the screen, in bold white letters, appears the slogan, “There's a Soldier in All of Us.”

Activision hired Wayne McClammy as the director. Wayne has been the director of many Call of Duty advertisements. According to Activision Publishing CMO Tim Ellis, the trailer's intent was to show that “The gaming population is so much bigger and more diverse than people may think". Actors Michael B. Jordan and Cara Delevingne were chosen to star in the trailer as both were known by Activision to be fans of the Call of Duty series.

Pre-order
Call of Duty: Black Ops III and the Digital Deluxe Edition counterpart were available to pre-order on PlayStation 4, Xbox One, and PC. The Digital Deluxe Edition comes with the season pass, which can also be ordered separately. Pre-ordering provided access to the Call of Duty: Black Ops III multiplayer beta and in-game items for Call of Duty: Advanced Warfare, such as custom reticles, an emblem, a calling card, and Advanced Supply Drops. Sony also announced that the Black Ops III beta would come to the PS4 first on August 19 through August 23, 2015. The beta for the PS4 went live on August 18, 2015, several hours earlier than originally announced. After the beta period ended, it was announced that all pre-orders would include the bonus multiplayer map "NUK3TOWN", a remake of the original "Nuketown" map, featured in Call of Duty: Black Ops, and in Call of Duty: Black Ops II as "Nuketown 2025". Owing to the lack of the campaign mode, the PlayStation 3 and Xbox 360 versions included a digital copy of Black Ops as an added bonus, as well as having their price reduced by 10 dollars compared to the PlayStation 4 and Xbox One versions.

Comics tie-in
A comic book titled Call of Duty: Black Ops III was announced on July 1, 2015. Serving as a prequel to the game, the first issue was released worldwide on November 4, 2015, and was published by Dark Horse Comics. The story is written by Larry Hama, while Marcelo Ferreira served as the artist for the comic book. The story takes place several years prior to the main events of the game, and stars Jacob Hendricks and John Taylor along with their black ops squadmates in an attempt to stop a Russian terrorist plot. Subsequent issues were released throughout 2016.

On July 11, 2016, Treyarch announced a new comic book series titled Call of Duty: Zombies, to expand upon the story of the Zombies mode. The story features the return of the TranZit team: Abigail "Misty" Briarton, Marlton Johnson, Russman and Samuel Stuhlinger, previously the main protagonists of Call of Duty: Black Ops II, as they embark on a search for an artifact known as the Kronorium, while discovering the truth behind Edward Richtofen's reappearance. The miniseries, also published by Dark Horse, features Justin Jordan as the writer and Jonathan Wayshak as the main artist, while Simon Bisley draws the cover art of each issue. The first issue was released on October 28, 2016, and subsequent issues were released throughout 2017.

Special editions and downloadable content
In addition to the Digital Deluxe Edition, other special editions include the Hardened Edition and the Juggernog Edition. The Juggernog Edition includes a mini-refrigerator, a season pass and multiple in-game content. A Collector's Edition bonus map for the Zombie mode, "The Giant" was announced. It is a remake of the Call of Duty: World at War map "Der Riese", and features the original characters, Dempsey, Nikolai, Takeo, and Richtofen. A multiplayer-only starter pack for Windows was announced and released on February 16, 2016. It features the multiplayer mode's core mechanics, though certain features, such as the Zombie mode and the Nightmare mode, were excluded. This version of the game is available for players to purchase until the end of February 2016, though it has been made available permanently since.

In December 2015, during Sony's PlayStation Experience event, Activision announced the first downloadable content map pack for Black Ops III, titled "Awakening", and was released first on PlayStation 4 on February 2, 2016. Releases for Windows and Xbox One happened in March 2016. The map pack contains four new multiplayer maps: "Skyjacked" (a remake of the Black Ops II multiplayer map "Hijacked"), "Rise", "Splash", and "Gauntlet", a new Zombies map, Der Eisendrache, and several new gumballs for the Zombie mode. In March 2016, Treyarch revealed the second map pack, titled "Eclipse". The map pack has four new multiplayer maps, including a remake of the World at War map "Bonzai" and a new Zombies map, "Zetsubou no Shima". The map pack was released on April 19 for PlayStation 4 and May 19 for Xbox One and PC.

The third map pack, Descent, was revealed on June 28, 2016, featuring four new MP maps, including a remake of the Black Ops II map "Raid" and a new Zombies map, "Gorod Krovi". The map pack was released on July 12 for PlayStation 4 and August 11 for Xbox One and PC. The PC release of Descent received controversy, for Activision and Treyarch announced that the map packs would no longer be sold separately, and PC players must purchase the season pass to receive all map packs, while owners of Awakening and/or Eclipse would receive discounts upon purchasing the season pass. The fourth map pack, Salvation, was revealed on August 25, 2016, with remakes of the MP maps "Standoff" from Black Ops II and "Outskirt" from World at War, along with the final Zombies map, "Revelations". The map pack was released on September 6 for PlayStation 4, and October 6 for Xbox One and PC.

A fifth and final map pack, Zombies Chronicles, contains remastered versions of 8 Zombies maps from previous games: "Nacht Der Untoten", "Verrückt", and "Shi no Numa" from World at War, "Kino Der Toten", "Ascension", "Shangri-La", and "Moon" from Black Ops, and "Origins" from Black Ops II, and is not included in the season pass of the game. The map pack was released on May 16, 2017, for PlayStation 4, and June 16 for Xbox One and PC.

On May 24, 2017, Activision and Treyarch announced a Multiplayer DLC Trial Pack for the PC version of Black Ops III, allowing all players to play on all multiplayer maps from the four map packs for free for a limited time, while also offering XP bonuses to players who previously owned the map packs and/or the season pass. On March 20, 2018, the Zombies maps from the four map packs were made available for separate purchase on PlayStation 4 and Xbox One, with PC to follow on May 2. On June 11, 2018, Activision and Treyarch announced the "Back in Black" map pack, which contains four remastered versions of fan-favorite multiplayer maps from Black Ops and Black Ops II: "Summit", "Jungle", "Firing Range", and "Slums". These four maps, which are also included in Call of Duty: Black Ops 4 at launch, are offered exclusively to the PlayStation 4 version of the game for players who pre-order Black Ops 4 on the aforementioned platform.

Reception

Critical response

According to review aggregator Metacritic, Call of Duty: Black Ops III received "generally favorable" critic reviews for PlayStation 4 and Xbox One, and "mixed or average" critic reviews for PC. GameSpot awarded it a score of 7 out of 10, saying, "Black Ops III doesn't offer anything remarkable to the series, but does just enough to maintain the Call of Duty status quo. The franchise, however slowly, continues its inexorable march." Polygon also gave the game a score of 7 out of 10, saying "Black Ops IIIs biggest point of recommendation may be the breadth of content there, and that's a valid point of view. But Treyarch doesn't meaningfully move the series forward here." IGN awarded it a score of 9.2 out of 10, saying "With fun 4-player co-op, new powers, and a fleshed out Zombies mode, Black Ops 3 is the biggest Call of Duty game yet." Stuart Andrews of Trusted Reviews criticized the setting and narrative, writing "Black Ops 3 is a solid installment that will please the series' hardcore fans, but it's not a mainstream crowd-pleaser in the way that last year's Advanced Warfare was", and unfavorably compared it to its predecessors, disparaging that it "focuses entirely on the sci-fi stuff, loses most of its conspiracy theory trappings and brings augmented super-soldiers in. The result sometimes feels less like a third Black Ops game than Call of Duty: Even More Advanced Warfare.

The PS3 and Xbox 360 versions received less praise than the other versions. IGN's Brian Albert criticised the lack of the campaign in these versions, as well as the poor graphics and long waiting times, but concluded that despite these versions issues, they were still very fun to play.

Sales
Black Ops III sold over 6.6 million copies in its first week of sales (not including digital) and grossed over $550 million in sales during its first three days of release. In the United Kingdom, the game bested Halo 5: Guardians to become the top selling game. Black Ops III was the top best selling game in the US according to NPD's figures. Black Ops III later became the top selling game of 2015. According to Activision, Black Ops III was one of the best-selling games released for the eighth generation of video game consoles, and that its financial performance is significantly better than its predecessor, Call of Duty: Advanced Warfare.

Awards

References
Notes

Footnotes

External links

2015 video games
Activision games
Apocalyptic video games
Beenox games
Black Ops III
Cyberpunk video games
Dystopian video games
Existentialist video games
Fiction about mind control
First-person shooters
Science fiction shooter video games
Horror video games
Military science fiction video games
Multiplayer and single-player video games
PlayStation 3 games
PlayStation 4 games
PlayStation 4 Pro enhanced games
Science fiction video games
Terrorism in fiction
Transhumanism in video games
Treyarch games
Video games about cyborgs
Video games about disasters
Video games about mental health
Video games about robots
Video games about time travel
Video games about viral outbreaks
Video games about zombies
Video games scored by Jack Wall
Video games featuring protagonists of selectable gender
Fiction set in 2065
Video games set in the 2060s
Video games set in Ethiopia
Video games set in Switzerland
Video games set in Singapore
Video games set in Egypt
Video games set in Belgium
Video games set in California
Video games set in Angola
Video games set in Austria
Video games set in Oceania
Video games set in Iceland
Video games set in New York City
Video games set in Rome
Video games set in Brazil
Video games set in Russia
Video games set in Cuba
Video games set in Panama
Video games set in Vietnam
Video games set in France
Video games set in Berlin
Video games set in Japan
Video games set on the Moon
War video games set in the United States
Climate change in fiction
Windows games
Xbox 360 games
Xbox One games
Video games developed in the United States
Mercenary Technology games